Baima is a town of northeastern Miyi County in southern Sichuan province, China, situated  north-northeast of the county seat along G5 Beijing–Kunming Expressway. , it administers Guabang Residential Community and the following nine villages:
Guabang Village
Huangcao Village
Tianba Village
Tianjia Village
Weilong Village
Mabinglang Village
Longtang Village
Zongshuwan Village
Gaolong Village

References

Towns in Sichuan
Miyi County